Anthony Scaramozzino (born 30 April 1985) is a French professional football defender who plays for Thonon Evian.

Between 2003 and 2008, he played for Nice and also had loan spells with FC Lorient, Gillingham and AS Cannes.

Career
Ahead of the 2019–20 season, Scaramozzino signed a two-year contract with US Boulogne.

On 23 June 2021, he joined Bourg-en-Bresse.

Honours
AC Omonia
Cyprus FA Shield: 2012

References

External links
 
 
 

Living people
1985 births
French footballers
French expatriate footballers
Association football midfielders
Ligue 1 players
Ligue 2 players
Championnat National players
Championnat National 2 players
Championnat National 3 players
Super League Greece players
Cypriot First Division players
OGC Nice players
FC Lorient players
Gillingham F.C. players
AS Cannes players
CS Sedan Ardennes players
LB Châteauroux players
AC Omonia players
Panetolikos F.C. players
RC Lens players
Stade Lavallois players
US Boulogne players
Pau FC players
Football Bourg-en-Bresse Péronnas 01 players
Thonon Evian Grand Genève F.C. players
French expatriate sportspeople in England
French expatriate sportspeople in Greece
French expatriate sportspeople in Cyprus
Expatriate footballers in England
Expatriate footballers in Greece
Expatriate footballers in Cyprus